National Highway 365BB is a national highway in India.  It is a secondary route of National Highway 65. NH-365BB traverses the states of Telangana and Andhra Pradesh in India. It starts at Suryapet and ends at Kovvur(Rajamahendravaram).Major cities on this route are Suryapet, Khammam and Rajamahendravaram.

Route 
Telangana
Suryapet, Chivvemla, Mothey, Kusumanchi, Khammam, Wyra, Thallada, Mittapalli, Kalluru, Sattupalli, Ashwaraopeta - Andhra Pradesh Border.
Andhra Pradesh
Telangana border - Jeelugumilli, Buttaigudem, Kannapuram, Dondapudi, Pattiseema, Tallapudi, NH16 near Kovvur (Rajamahendravaram).

Project Details 
The National Highways Authority of India (NHAI) has proposed to construct the four-lane access controlled greenfield highway of a length of little over 162 km connecting Khammam of Telangana with Andhra Pradesh’s Devarapalli at an estimated cost of ₹4,609 crore.

The project was approved under the centrally-sponsored Bharatmala Pariyojana’s economic corridor development initiative more than one-and-a-half years ago.

The project involves acquisition of about 1,996 acres of agricultural lands spread in 31 villages of ten mandals of the district. The proposed greenfield express highway is likely to extend a distance of 96 km in Khammam district.

Junctions 

  Terminal near Suryapet.
  near Khammam
  near Khammam
  near Penuballi
  near Jeelugumilli
  Terminal near Kovvur(Rajamahendravaram).

See also 

 List of National Highways in India
 List of National Highways in India by state

Sources 
https://www.thehindu.com/news/cities/Hyderabad/survey-for-4-lane-greenfield-highway-begins/article31996962.ece

https://www.deccanchronicle.com/nation/current-affairs/280219/khammam-greenfield-highway-project-stalled-due-to-land-problems.html

References

External links 

 NH 365BB on OpenStreetMap

National highways in India
National Highways in Andhra Pradesh
National Highways in Telangana